John Hastings may refer to:

English noblemen
John Hastings, 1st Baron Hastings (1262–1313), peer and soldier
John Hastings, 2nd Baron Hastings (1287–1325), peer and soldier, son of above
John Hastings, 2nd Earl of Pembroke (1347–1375), peer and soldier, grandson of above
John Hastings, 3rd Earl of Pembroke (1372–1389), nobleman, son of above

Public officials
John Hastings (died c. 1585) (c. 1525–c. 1585), MP for Reading, Leicester, Bridport and Poole
John Hastings (Ohio politician) (1778–1854), Irish-born American Democratic lawyer, farmer and U.S. congressman
John Simpson Hastings (1898–1977), United States federal judge from Indiana
John A. Hastings (1900–1964), New York state senator
John Hastings (Ontario politician) (born 1942), member of the Legislative Assembly of Ontario

Sportspeople
Jack Hastings or John Hastings (1858–1935), Northern Irish international footballer
John Hastings (footballer) (1887–1972), English footballer
John Hastings (cricketer) (born 1985), Australian all-rounder

Others
John Woodland Hastings (1927–2014), American professor of biology at Harvard University
John Hastings (Passions)

See also
Hastings (name)
John Hastyng, MP for Reading